The Malagasy yellow bat (Scotophilus tandrefana), sometimes known as the western yellow bat, is a species of vesper bat endemic to Madagascar.

Taxonomy and etymology
It was described as a new species in 2005. The holotype was collected in 2003 just outside the Tsingy de Bemaraha Strict Nature Reserve in Madagascar. Its species name "tandrefana" is Malagasy for "from the west".

Description
The fur of its back is dark brown, while its belly fur is a medium shade of brown. It uses echolocation to navigate and find prey: it utilizes steep frequency-modulated echolocation (FM) as well as that of a quasi-constant frequency (QCF). Its echolocation reaches maximum energy around 48.2 kHz. Minimum frequency is 42.2 kHz, while maximum frequency is 91.2 kHz.

Conservation
As of 2019, it is listed as a data deficient species by the IUCN.

References

Mammals of Madagascar
Bats of Africa
Scotophilus
Mammals described in 2005